Nermin Nikšić (born 27 December 1960) is a Bosnian politician who served as the 8th Prime Minister of the Federation of Bosnia and Herzegovina from 2011 to 2015. He is the current president of the Social Democratic Party and is a former member of the national House of Representatives.

Born in Konjic in 1960, Nikšić holds a degree in law from the University of Mostar. Prior to the Bosnian War, he worked in Konjic as clerk of town planning, construction and housing, as well as communal services, marketing and catering inspecting. Nikšić was Head of the Inspection from 1990 until 1992.

In 2000, Nikšić was named deputy mayor of Konjic, but soon resigned since he became a member of the Federal House of Representatives. In March 2011, after a year-long government formation, he was named Federal Prime Minister, serving until March 2015. Nikšić was elected to the national House of Representatives at the 2018 general election.

He joined the Social Democratic Party (SDP BiH) in 1993. In late 2014, Nikšić was named president of the SDP BiH, following his predecessor Zlatko Lagumdžija's resignation.

Early life and education
Nikšić was born on 27 December 1960 in Konjic. He attended elementary and high school in his birth town. He graduated from Faculty of Law of University of Mostar in 1986.

From 1988, Nikšić was employed in Konjic, where he worked as clerk of town planning, construction and housing, as well as communal services, marketing and catering inspecting. From 1990 until 1992, he was Head of the Inspection.

Political career
In 1993, Nikšić joined the Social Democratic Party (SDP BiH). One year later, he became president of the SDP BiH in Konjic. During the Bosnian War, he served as assistant to the commander of the 7th Brigade for legal jobs and assistant to the commander of the 43rd Brigade for moral.

From 1995 until 1998, Nikšić was vice president of the executive committee of the Municipality of Konjic, and from 1998 until 2000 he was head of General Administration, Housing and Communal Services and Inspections. In 2000, Nikšić was named deputy mayor of Konjic, but soon resigned since he became a member of the Federal House of Representatives.

From 2002 until 2006, he was vice president of the SDP BiH club in parliament. In 2004, Nikšić became president of the SDP BiH in the Herzegovina-Neretva Canton. In November 2006, he was president of the SDP BiH parliamentary club. On 7 December 2014, Nikšić became president of the SDP BiH, succeeding Zlatko Lagumdžija.

On 17 March 2011, after a political crisis in Bosnia and Herzegovina, he was named Prime Minister of the Federation of Bosnia and Herzegovina. The political crisis occurred after the 2010 general election when major parties were unable to come to an agreement to form the new government. He served as Federal Prime Minister until 31 March 2015.

At the 2018 general election, Nikšić was elected to the national House of Representatives. He failed to get re-elected to the House of Representatives at the 2022 general election.

Personal life
Nermin is married to Nadija Nikšić, and together they have two children, a daughter Najra and a son Haris.

References

External links

Nermin Nikšić at imovinapoliticara.cin.ba

1960 births
Living people
People from Konjic
Bosniaks of Bosnia and Herzegovina
Politicians of the Federation of Bosnia and Herzegovina
Social Democratic Party of Bosnia and Herzegovina politicians
Prime ministers of the Federation of Bosnia and Herzegovina
Members of the House of Representatives (Bosnia and Herzegovina)